Banogne-Recouvrance is a commune in the Ardennes department in the Grand Est region of northern France.

The inhabitants of the commune are known as Banognais or Banognaises.

Geography

Banogne-Recouvrance is located some 20 km north-west of Rethel and 33 km east of Laon. Access to the commune is by the D30 road from Saint-Quentin-le-Petit in the north-west which passes through the centre of the commune and the village and continues south-east to Condé-lès-Herpy. The D35 goes from the village to Le Thour in the south-west. The D135 goes north from the village to join the D2 north of the commune. Apart from the village at the centre of the commune there is the hamlet of Recouvrance to the east. The commune is entirely farmland.

The writer Ernst Jünger remembered his passing through the village as a small village off the main roads, nestled in graceful chalk hills.

Neighbouring communes and villages

History
The village is mentioned in cartularies of the 13th century.

In 1570 Banogne is described in the census as attached to the Parish of Thour whose barons and the Hotel Dieu de Reims share the land. A strong ditch surrounded Recouvrance providing a refuge for the inhabitants. A place called Ruisselois was the property of the Abbey of Signy then of the Jesuit college in Reims. A white chalk quarry is operated nearby.

In 1828 these villages were united into one commune with Banogne at the centre (with Le Ruisselois as a hamlet). Recouvrance also became a hamlet.

In 1918 the village was the site of fierce fighting during the Battle of St. Quentin Canal in the last weeks of the war. On 25 October the French army captured the heights of the commune and so seized the last stretch between Saint-Quentin and the Aisne valley of the system of German fortifications from La Fère to Rethel called the Hunding Stellung. Of the 125 houses in the town only 10 remained standing at the end of the fighting. The village and the church were rebuilt in the following decade.

Heraldry

Administration

List of Successive Mayors

Demography
In 2017 the commune had 157 inhabitants. The population data given in the table and graph below for 1821 and earlier refer to the former commune of Banogne.

Sites and monuments

A Church rebuilt after the First World War.

Notable people linked to the commune
Ernst Jünger, German writer, he stayed in the hamlet of Recouvrance when he was a young soldier. This hamlet was slightly behind the front (on the German side) in early 1915 and served as a training area. Ernst Jünger devoted several pages to his stay, which preceded his engagement at the front, in his journal Storm of Steel.

See also
Communes of the Ardennes department

References

External links
Banogne-Recouvrance on the old National Geographic Institute website 
Banogne-Recouvrance on Géoportail, National Geographic Institute (IGN) website 
Bannogne and Recouvrance on the 1750 Cassini Map

Communes of Ardennes (department)